Mark Wahlberg is an American actor and producer.

Film

Television

Executive producer

See also
List of awards and nominations received by Mark Wahlberg

References

Male actor filmographies
Filmography
American filmographies